Ewa Alicja Majewska (born 21 July, 1978) is a Polish philosopher, political activist and an author. In the 1990s and early 2000s, she was involved in anarchist, anti-border, ecological and women's movements. 

She is a contributor to prominent international conferences, projects and published articles and essays, in journals, magazines, and collected volumes, including: e-flux, Signs, Third Text, Journal of Utopian Studies, and Jacobin. 

She was visiting fellow at UC Berkeley, Institute for Human Sciences (Vienna) and is currently affiliated with the Institute of Cultural Inquiry (Berlin).

Biography 
Majewska studied philosophy, French literature and gender studies at the University of Warsaw, Poland. She completed her doctorate on philosophical concepts of the family at the University of Warsaw in 2007. Since 2003, she has been a lecturer in gender studies at the university.

From 2011 to 2013, she was a professor at the Institute of Culture at the Jagiellonian University in Cracow, Poland, followed by two years as a visiting fellow at the Institute of Human Sciences in Vienna, Austria and a further two years (2014 to 2016) at ICI Berlin. 

Her current research is in Hegel's philosophy, focusing on the dialectics and the weak, feminist critical theory and antifascist cultures. Her book, Feminist Antifascism: Counterpublics of the Common, was published by Verso in 2021.

She volunteered for the Polish IndyMedia and worked in the women's section of the Committee for Assistance and Defense of Repressed Workers. She is also the author of a report on violence against women in the family and intimate relations for the Polish branch of Amnesty International (2005). 

In 2004, together with Aleksandra Polisiewicz, she formed the duo Syreny TV. It produced documentaries from a series of Warsaw demonstrations and the project All Forward to the Extreme Right (2005). This film is a record of conversations revolving around the analogy between Poland of 2005 and the Weimar Republic. It was screened in Weimar at the festival Attention, Polen Kommen! (2005) and at exhibitions in Warsaw and Gdańsk.

Politics 
In the years 2015-2018, she was a member of the social-democratic Polish political party, Lewica Razem (Left Together), and occupied positions on the party's supervising committee and national council. In the parliamentary elections in 2015, she ran for the Sejm in the Warsaw district from 26th place on the Total List. As part of the party, she participated in the work of the statutory commission, and co-created the 'Together for Culture' programme. In May 2016, she was elected to the party's national audit committee and in June 2017 to the national council. Since the end of 2018, she is no longer a party member.

Books

As single author 
 Art as a guise? Censorship and other paradoxes of politicizing culture. Krakow: Ha!art corporation, 2013, series: The Radical Line. .
 Feminism as a social philosophy. Sketches from family theory. Warsaw: Difin, 2009. .

Shared authorship 
 Ewa Majewska, Jan Sowa (ed.): Zniewolony umysł 2. Krakow: korporacja ha!art, 2007, series: The Radical Line. .
 Martin Kaltwasser, Ewa Majewska, Kuba Szreder (ed.): Futurism of industrial cities. Kraków: korporacja ha!art, 2007. .
 E. Majewska, E. Rutkowska, Equal School, House of Polish-German Cooperation, Gliwice, 2007.
 A. Wolosik, E. Majewska, Sexual harassment Stupid fun or serious matter, Diffin Publishing House, Warsaw, 2011.

Recent publications 
 Anti-fascist Cultures, Institutions of the Common, and Weak Resistance in Poland, in: Third Text, 33/2019: A Bitter Victory?
 Praktyka Teoretyczna on Weak Resistance (2/2019):  
 On Feminism: Feminism Will Not Be Televised
 On Ophelic Counterpublics: Ewa Majewska en

References

1978 births
Polish women scientists
Polish anarchists
Polish agnostics
Polish atheists
People from Warsaw
Living people